Yar is a rural locality (a settlement) in Gorod Vyazniki, Vyaznikovsky District, Vladimir Oblast, Russia. The population was 2 as of 2010.

Geography 
Yar is located 13 km east of Vyazniki (the district's administrative centre) by road. Log is the nearest rural locality.

References 

Rural localities in Vyaznikovsky District